Huntsbury is a suburb of Christchurch, New Zealand, on the fringes of the Port Hills three kilometres south of the city centre. Huntsbury amalgamated with Christchurch City on 1 April 1941, on the same day as the New Brighton borough joined the city council.

History

Cashmere Sanatorium

The Huntsbury hillside was originally the site of the Cashmere Sanatorium complex, a tuberculosis hospital which opened in 1914. At the time, best practice tuberculosis treatment consistent of "open air" living, so many patients in the complex lived in "huts", about 9 square metres with permanently open doors and windows, even in winter. After antibiotics largely eliminated tuberculosis, these huts were phased out from 1950, but one was restored by the city council and is found at the end of the private road Kimbolton Lane. 

Other huts were built by returned servicemen as temporary homes while earning money to build permanent homes. These people were known as "hutters" or "hutties" and were the subject of complaints by other residents.

Residential development

The first sections were sold for housing on Huntsbury Hill in January 1920.

A water reservoir with capacity for 35,000 cubic metre was built in 1952. 

Following the discharge of the final tuberculosis patient in the 1960s, the sanatorium complex became the site of Coronation Hospital, before it too closed in 1991. Construction company, Fulton Hogan, demolished the last of the complex to make way for the Broad Oaks subdivision.

21st century

By 2011, the Huntsbury water reservoir was Christchurch's main drinking water storage facility. During the 2011 Christchurch earthquake a previously unknown shear zone beneath the facility ruptured. The basin was shattered and water drained into the cracked hills, while the pump station was extensively damaged. Following the quake a new pump station was commissioned, and the reservoir was replaced with two structures on either side of the shear zone, designed to move independently in future quakes.

The 2011 earthquake also had a marked effect on the suburb's houses. By 2020, many houses had been repaired but many other sites remained empty following demolitions, and retaining walls broken.

Demographics

Huntsbury had a population of 2,268 at the 2018 New Zealand census, an increase of 240 people (11.8%) since the 2013 census, and an increase of 147 people (6.9%) since the 2006 census. There were 849 households. There were 1,131 males and 1,137 females, giving a sex ratio of 0.99 males per female. The median age was 45.8 years (compared with 37.4 years nationally), with 372 people (16.4%) aged under 15 years, 357 (15.7%) aged 15 to 29, 1,155 (50.9%) aged 30 to 64, and 378 (16.7%) aged 65 or older.

Ethnicities were 94.2% European/Pākehā, 4.6% Māori, 0.7% Pacific peoples, 3.8% Asian, and 2.0% other ethnicities (totals add to more than 100% since people could identify with multiple ethnicities).

The proportion of people born overseas was 23.1%, compared with 27.1% nationally.

Although some people objected to giving their religion, 58.9% had no religion, 32.7% were Christian, 0.3% were Hindu, 0.5% were Buddhist and 2.0% had other religions.

Of those at least 15 years old, 705 (37.2%) people had a bachelor or higher degree, and 171 (9.0%) people had no formal qualifications. The median income was $46,300, compared with $31,800 nationally. The employment status of those at least 15 was that 981 (51.7%) people were employed full-time, 369 (19.5%) were part-time, and 48 (2.5%) were unemployed.

Features
Huntsbury Community Centre was fundraised in the early 1970s and opened in 1975. The centre is sited across the street from the water reservoir.

Huntsbury is host to one of four fountains scattered over Christchurch. Huntsbury's fountain is at the top of Conifer Place.

Sources

References 

Suburbs of Christchurch